The women's 4 x 100 metre medley relay competition at the 2014 South American Games took place on March 10 at the Estadio Nacional. The last champion was Brazil.

Records
Prior to this competition, the existing world and Pan Pacific records were as follows:

Results
All times are in minutes and seconds.

Heats
Heats weren't performed, as only seven teams had entered.

Final 
The final was held on March 10, at 21:13.

References

Swimming at the 2014 South American Games